Butyriboletus brunneus is a pored mushroom  in the family Boletaceae. This North American species was originally described by Charles Horton Peck in 1890 as a variety of Boletus speciosus.

See also
List of North American boletes

References

External links

brunneus
Fungi described in 1890
Fungi of North America
Taxa named by Charles Horton Peck